Kelly Crawford Perdew (born January 29, 1967) is an American businessman and winner of The Apprentice 2.

Before The Apprentice
Perdew was born in Lexington, Kentucky and was raised in Florida and Wyoming. Prior to winning the show, he was president of  CoreObjects, a software development outsourcing company based in Los Angeles.

Perdew attended the United States Military Academy at West Point, earning a Bachelor of Science degree in national security and public affairs in 1989, graduating as the number one ranked cadet in his field of study and in the top 5% of his overall class.

While at West Point, Perdew attended Ranger and Airborne training. In addition to his regular studies at West Point, Perdew interned with the House Armed Services Committee, spent a semester on "exchange" at the Naval Academy, and was a finalist in the Rhodes Scholar competition. He served in the United States Army as a military intelligence officer for three years.

After his honorable discharge as a First Lieutenant, Perdew attended graduate schools at the University of California, Los Angeles (UCLA), earning a joint JD/MBA degree from the UCLA School of Law and the UCLA Anderson School of Management, respectively, in 1995. He chose not to practice law after graduation, although during law school he worked part-time at the firm of Gibson, Dunn & Crutcher.

During the show
Perdew was 37 when participating in The Apprentice 2 and was the oldest candidate on the show. He was eventually chosen by Donald Trump to be his apprentice, nominally managing the construction of Trump Place located in the Upper West Side of Manhattan, New York but in reality promoting it. It was also revealed in The Apprentice 3 finale that Perdew was an executive vice-president for Trump's brand of bottled water, Trump Ice.

Current career

Perdew is the Managing Partner for Moonshots Capital – an early-stage angel syndicate.  He has personally invested in over 30 early-stage technology companies and acted as a board member or advisor to many including LinkedIn and Pandora.  He is the founder & CEO at TargetClose. Prior to founding TargetClose, he was the CEO of Fastpoint Games, a venture-backed leading developer of live data-driven games for the fortune 500 brand set.  Fastpoint Games sold to WePlay in December 2011.

Prior to Fastpoint Games, he was President of ProElite.com, a social networking site for mixed martial arts. He was also the President of eTeamz with founder Brian Johnson that is now a part of Active Network, LLC and serving over 3 million amateur sports teams.

Perdew filmed nine episodes of a show called G.I Factory on the Military Channel, which did not get picked up for a second series. He has also done a commercial titled "Today's Military"  with Donald Trump, involving him accepting a "military challenge"  from him. Perdew is also the author of Take Command: 10 Leadership Principles Learned in the Military And Put To Work For Donald Trump  The book focuses on leadership principles that are necessary for success in business and life and includes interviews with business/military icons such as Ross Perot, Bill Coleman and Roger Staubach.

Perdew founded a company called American Family Protection, Inc. to provide government-approved training modules to U.S. families on how to respond to a terrorist attack. The interactive CD is called the Terrorist Attack Survival Kit.

In June 2006, Perdew received a Presidential Appointment from President George W. Bush to the Council on Service and Civic Participation.

He currently serves on the board of advisors of the Code of Support Foundation, a nonprofit military service organization.

References

External links

1967 births
American business executives
American business writers
Writers from California
Writers from Lexington, Kentucky
Living people
United States Army officers
United States Military Academy alumni
UCLA Anderson School of Management alumni
UCLA School of Law alumni
Businesspeople from Lexington, Kentucky
Businesspeople from Florida
The Trump Organization employees
21st-century American businesspeople
American drink industry businesspeople
The Apprentice (franchise) winners
Participants in American reality television series
People associated with Gibson Dunn